Glendora is a village in Tallahatchie County, Mississippi. The population was 285 at the 2000 census.

History

Glendora was developed by White Americans as a small sawmill site. Logs were floated down the river from around the vicinity of Webb to be processed here.

The first settlement developed two miles south of Glendora at Black Bayou. When the railroad was built through the territory in 1883, a station was located there and called Glendora. The town immediately grew. A post office was established in 1900 and a voting precinct was established.

Cane Lake Lumber Company built a large sawmill here which operated until 1909. It was moved to another site.

In December 1955, Elmer Kimbrell, a white man, shot and killed Clinton Melton, an African-American resident, in front of three witnesses after an argument about how much gas Melton had pumped into Kimbrell's car. Kimbrell was acquitted by an all-white jury after a short trial. Shortly before this murder, he was involved in the Emmett Till murder in Money, Mississippi. At this time, most blacks in Mississippi were still disenfranchised due to state barriers; they were not part of the jury pool because they were not registered voters and they were excluded from the political system.

Geography

Demographics

At the 2000 census, there were 285 people, 69 households and 60 families residing in the village. The population density was 2,011.5 per square mile (786.0/km). There were 73 housing units at an average density of 515.2 per square mile (201.3/km). The racial makeup was 4.56% White, 92.28% African American, 0.70% Native American, and 2.46% from two or more races. Hispanic or Latino of any race were 3.16% of the population.

There were 69 households, of which 55.1% had children under the age of 18 living with them, 29.0% were married couples living together, 50.7% had a female householder with no husband present, and 11.6% were non-families. 8.7% of all households were made up of individuals, and 2.9% had someone living alone who was 65 years of age or older. The average household size was 4.13 and the average family size was 4.26.

41.8% of the population were under the age of 18, 15.4% from 18 to 24, 23.2% from 25 to 44, 14.7% from 45 to 64, and 4.9% who were 65 years of age or older. The median age was 21 years. For every 100 females, there were 82.7 males. For every 100 females age 18 and over, there were 82.4 males.

The median household income was $14,375 and the median family income was $11,875. Males had a median income of $17,500 compared with  $11,250 for females. The per capita income for the village was $7,044. About 68.2% of families and 62.6% of the population were below the poverty line, including 83.3% of those under the age of 18 and 40.0% of those 65 or over.

Education
The Village of Glendora is served by the West Tallahatchie School District. R. H. Bearden Elementary School and West Tallahatchie High School are the area schools.

Previously Black Bayou Elementary School served children in Glendora and southern parts of the district. The district decided to close Black Bayou in 1998. Previously West District Middle School (now Bearden) served as a middle school for the area.

Coahoma Community College is the designated community college.

Notable people
 Sonny Boy Williamson (Alex "Rice" Miller), the influential blues musician, and Mississippi Musicians Hall of Famer was born on a plantation near Glendora in 1912.

References

External links

 Village of Glendora

Villages in Tallahatchie County, Mississippi
Villages in Mississippi